Bert Jacobs (5 March 1941 – 14 November 1999) was a Dutch football manager, who played for HFC Haarlem. Jacobs was a football trainer at a young age, worked for Roda JC, FC Utrecht, Fortuna Sittard, Vitesse Arnhem, RKC Waalwijk and Sporting de Gijón. Renowned for his level-headed insight into the game of football and for coining the term "Hotsknotsbegonia football."

References
  Profile
  Profile

1941 births
1999 deaths
People from Zandvoort
Dutch footballers
Dutch football managers
Dutch expatriate football managers
Sparta Rotterdam managers
SBV Vitesse managers
Roda JC Kerkrade managers
HFC Haarlem players
FC Utrecht managers
Sporting de Gijón managers
RKC Waalwijk managers
Willem II (football club) managers
SV SVV managers

Association footballers not categorized by position
Footballers from North Holland